Daniel Lins Côrtes (born 12 December 1979), nicknamed Daniel, is a Brazilian-born New Zealand footballer.

Club career
Born in Niteroi, Brazil, Daniel started his professional career at Madureira. In April 1999, he signed for FC Twente. He then returned to Brazil for Madureira he was signed by FC Fehérvár in April 2002 and 2003 returned again to Madureira.

In April 2003, he was signed for three years with one of the biggest clubs in Brazil, Botafogo. In July 2005, he was signed on loan to Juventude. In January 2006, he was signed for Guarani.

Wellington Phoenix
In July 2007, he was signed by Wellington Phoenix coach Ricki Herbert. Daniel made 17 appearances in his first season, 2007–08, scoring 4 goals. In October 2008, he was rewarded with a new two-year deal, lasting until June 2011. Daniel scored the first ever goal for the Phoenix

Daniel was granted New Zealand citizenship on 2 December 2008 and declared his aspirations to represent New Zealand internationally.

Daniel, a foundation player of the Phoenix, was the second player to reach 50 appearances for the Phoenix behind left-back Tony Lochhead. On 20 January 2012, Daniel made his 100th appearance for the Wellington Phoenix against the Newcastle Jets.

His contract was not renewed for the 2012–13 A-League.

INSEE Police
On 19 July 2012, INSEE Police United in Thai Premier League announced that Daniel had signed an 18-month contract.

Representative career
Daniel became eligible for New Zealand on 14 May 2012 after residing in the country for five years.

A-League career statistics

References

External links
 

1979 births
Living people
Association football midfielders
Brazilian footballers
New Zealand association footballers
Brazilian expatriate footballers
Botafogo de Futebol e Regatas players
Esporte Clube Juventude players
Guarani FC players
Fehérvár FC players
Wellington Phoenix FC players
Sportspeople from Niterói
Brazilian expatriate sportspeople in New Zealand
FC Twente players
Eredivisie players
A-League Men players
Expatriate footballers in Hungary
Expatriate footballers in the Netherlands
Expatriate association footballers in New Zealand
Expatriate footballers in Thailand